Anton Sema (born 20 October 1978) is a Russian rower. He competed in the men's single sculls event at the 1996 Summer Olympics.

References

1978 births
Living people
Russian male rowers
Olympic rowers of Russia
Rowers at the 1996 Summer Olympics
Place of birth missing (living people)